Piya Yaza Dewi (1360s –  April 1392) was the chief queen consort of King Razadarit of Hanthawaddy Pegu from 1384 to 1392. Razadarit's reaffirmation of Piya Yaza Dewi as the chief queen in 1390 contributed to Queen Tala Mi Daw's subsequent suicide.

Brief
According to the Razadarit Ayedawbon chronicle, the future queen was a commoner named Mwei Maneit (မွေ့ မနိတ်; "Miss Ruby"). She was a flower seller (or cooking oil seller). She was married to Ma Chut Sut (also known as Ma Aung Sut). One morning in  May/June 1383, Prince Binnya Nwe who had started a rebellion against his father, King Binnya U, saw her at the outskirts of Dagon. The prince was taken by Mwei Maneit's beauty, and took her. Her husband fled to Pegu, and reported the news to Princess Maha Dewi, the prince's aunt and adoptive mother. It wasn't just the husband that reacted to the news badly. At Pegu, Prince Binnya Nwe's first wife, Tala Mi Daw, who had just given birth to their first child Bawlawkyantaw, was deeply hurt.

At any rate, Maneit became a wife of the rebel prince in exile. About seven months later, she became the chief queen of the Kingdom of Hanthawaddy. On 2 January 1384, King Binnya U died. Two days later, the court accepted the rebel son Binnya Nwe, who had returned to Pegu, as king. The commoner was not Razadarit's first choice to be the chief queen. Nwe called for Tala Mi Daw, who was also his half-sister and of royal birth, but she refused to see him. In response, Nwe held the coronation ceremony the next day, 5 January 1384, with Maneit as his chief queen. He took the title "Razadarit", and gave Maneit the title "Piya Yaza Dewi".

The young king's relationship with his first wife never recovered, and Piya Yaza Dewi remained the chief queen. Her position was once again reaffirmed in 1390. That year, Razadarit held another, grander, coronation ceremony to commemorate his success in reunifying three Mon-speaking regions. He had Piya Yaza Dewi by his side as the chief queen at the ceremony. Tala Mi daw was again deeply hurt. The arguments between them escalated. The king now took away Tala Mi Daw's family heirlooms—a dozen rings given by their father King Binnya U—and gave them to Piya Yaza Dewi. Bitter and heartbroken, Tala Mi Daw committed suicide. Razadarit then ordered their only child Bawlawkyantaw to be executed because he suspected that the young son would later avenge for his mother. According to legend, Bawlawkyantaw before his death swore to be reborn as a prince of Ava, and reincarnated as Prince Minye Kyawswa of Ava, who later became Razadarit's nemesis.

Piya Yaza Dewi herself died  April 1392 (or 1393). Chronicles do not report any children by her. She was succeeded by Mwei Ohn-Naung as chief queen.

Notes

References

Bibliography
 
 
 

Chief queens consort of Hanthawaddy
1392 deaths
14th-century Burmese women